S-DMB (Satellite-DMB) was a hybrid version of the Digital Multimedia Broadcasting. The S-DMB used the S band (2170-2200 MHz) of IMT-2000. and delivered around 18 channels at 128 kbit/s in 15 MHz. It incorporated a high power geostationary satellite, the MBSat 1 (since 2013, sold to Asia Broadcasting Satellite (ABS) of China). For outdoor and light indoor coverage is integrated with a terrestrial repeater (low power gap-filler) network for indoor coverage in urban areas.

A similar architecture is also used in XM Satellite Radio, Sirius Satellite Radio,  DVB-SH and ETSI Satellite Digital Radio (SDR).

S-DMB deployment
On May 1, 2005 South Korea became the first country in the world to start S-DMB service. The service provider was TU Media, subsidiary of SK Telecom. The same satellite and system was used in Japan on the  defunct MobaHo! service (2004–2009) of Mobile Broadcasting Corporation (MBCO).

S-DMB Supported Devices
Samsung (Anycall)
 All the SCH-B Series. (E.g., SCH-B500, SCH-B540, SCH-B600, SCH-B890)
 SCH-W920
 SCH-M495 (Omnia)

Pantech (SKY)
 IM-U140

LG (CYON)
 SB310, SB210, SH150

Motorola
 ZN40

S-DMB Channels
 Video Channels contain about 20 channels featuring news, sports, movies, animations, dramas, and educational programs. (E.g. CNN, National Geographic Channels, BBC.)
 Audio Channels contain about 13 various channels including English channels. Sound quality is near CD quality at AAC 128kbit/s.
 Extra 2 Pay Per View (PPV) channels for movies and adult channel.

Legacy
Due to financial issues with the joint venture, the broadcasting operations of S-DMB were stopped on 31 March 2009.

Asia Broadcasting Satellite (ABS) of China purchased the MBSat 1 satellite in 2013, moved it to at 75° E and renamed it ABS 2i. Later it was renamed ABS 4 (Mobisat).

See also
 TU Media (The First S-DMB Provider In South Korea)
 DAB (Digital Audio Broadcasting)
 DMB (Digital Multimedia Broadcasting)
 DRM (Digital Radio Mondiale)
 MediaFLO
 CMMB (China Multimedia Mobile Broadcasting)
 MobaHo!
 Multimedia Broadcast Multicast Service
 Satellite radio
 Satellite television
 WiMAX

External links
 Indagine conoscitiva sulla fornitura di servizi televisivi in mobilità from Autorità per le Garanzie nelle Comunicazioni
 WinProp for the Planning of S-DMB Networks
 IST MoDiS
 IST MoDiS - S-DMB System Definition
 ESA Telecommunications: S-DMB Radio Phase A
 Development of an Integrated RF Module
 3G - Satellite DMB for Wireless
 AsiaMedia - Satellite DMB soars, terrestrial DMB struggles

Digital radio